Tanner Delbert Thorson (born May 7, 1996) is an American professional dirt track racing driver. He competes in the United States Auto Club (USAC) and World of Outlaws. Thorson has also competed in the NASCAR Camping World Truck Series, last driving the Nos. 12 and 20 Chevrolet Silverados for Young's Motorsports in 2018.

Racing career

USAC racing

Thorson raced in the USAC Midget National Tour for many years. He won the 2016 USAC National Midget Series championship on the strength of 17 wins. A highlight of the season was winning the Gold Crown Midget Nationals at Tri-City Speedway. He also made some starts in asphalt Late Models and an ARCA start on the dirt at the Springfield Mile. Thorson began USAC Sprint Car racing in 2021 and ran for the Rookie of the Year. He won his first USAC wingless Sprint Car feature on April 23, 2021 at Big Diamond Speedway in his thirteenth start. Thorson won his fifth feature USAC Midget win of the season on August 5, 2021 at Bridgeport Speedway. It was Thorson's 25th career win, which put him in 16th place on the all-time wins list.

On January 16, 2022, Thorson beat Christopher Bell to claim his first Chili Bowl Nationals win.

Camping World Truck Series
In 2018, it was announced that Thorson would drive the No. 20 truck for Young's Motorsports in conjunction with Team Dillon Racing for the majority of the 2018 NCWTS schedule.

Personal life
Thorson sustained injuries in a traffic crash in the early hours of March 4, 2019. According to the California Highway Patrol, Thorson rear-ended a milk truck in a construction zone while driving the truck that carried his sprint car back from a race in Las Vegas, Nevada.

Motorsports career results

NASCAR
(key) (Bold – Pole position awarded by qualifying time. Italics – Pole position earned by points standings or practice time. * – Most laps led.)

Camping World Truck Series

K&N Pro Series East

 Season still in progress
 Ineligible for series points

ARCA Racing Series
(key) (Bold – Pole position awarded by qualifying time. Italics – Pole position earned by points standings or practice time. * – Most laps led.)

References

External links
 

Living people
1996 births
NASCAR drivers
ARCA Menards Series drivers
People from Minden, Nevada
Racing drivers from Nevada
CARS Tour drivers
USAC Silver Crown Series drivers